The 2012 Scottish Women's Premier League Cup was the 11th edition of the SWPL Cup competition, which began in 2002. The competition was to be contested by all 12 teams of the Scottish Women's Premier League (SWPL

First round 

|report    =
|stadium   =Saughton Sports Complex
|location  =Edinburgh
|attendance=
}}

Quarter-finals

Semi-finals

Final

External links
at soccerway.com
at Scottish Football Historical Results Archive

References

1
Scot
Scot
Scottish Women's Premier League seasons